There are different methods by which gold mining companies are ranked.  One is by their annual production. Another is by their cash cost per ounce, that is, how much money it costs them to mine the gold.  Since gold prices are the same everywhere, companies with lower costs per ounce make more profit. The most common method lists by market capitalization which considers the total value of capital holdings by that company. Also considered when comparing companies is their market capitalization per ounce of gold equivalent (sometimes abbreviated MV-GEO, EVO if the enterprise value is used) which takes the market value and total reserves and resources for each company as well as the price of gold into consideration. The figures for each company can be used to determine the value the stock market gives to each company's reserves on an ounce to ounce basis.

If the calculation is to exclude financial assets the enterprise value is used instead of market capitalization.
EVO = Enterprise Value/Ounce (gold equivalent) = Enterprise Value divided by resources. The enterprise value is the difference between a company's market capitalization (product of the number of company shares and listed stock price) and its cash, investments less debt (amortization). Three of the 10 largest companies by market cap that engage in gold mining, Fresnillo, Buenaventura and Freeport-McMoran (copper/molybdenum) are not included in the first list because they are minor gold producers/most of their revenue comes from a metal other than gold (Fresnillo and Buenaventura rely more on silver, in some lists silver production is treated as gold production, converted to gold equivalent using the gold to silver price ratio; McMoran produced 32.375 tonnes of gold in 2013 (up 32% after falling by 31% in 2012) but gold accounted for only 8% of revenue (down from 10%).

World gold production in 2008 declined by 50 tonnes despite a strong showing in market price. Total production cash costs were up 4.1% industrywide in the third quarter of 2010 to US$585 per ounce of gold mined. The lower price of gold in 2013 is expected to impact gold production in the coming years; Barrick Gold is slowing construction at one of its largest gold projects Pascua Lama (18 m ounces of gold, 676 m ounces of silver) while in Australia mines are being shuttered by companies in an attempt to curb costs.

In 2016, five of the world's 10 largest producing regions recorded growth in output, they are: China (450 tons +5), Russia (250 +8 tons), USA (209 tons +9), Canada (170 tons +10), Mexico (125 tons +5) and Indonesia (100 tons +25); In 2015 only Australia, Peru, Mexico, Uzbekistan and Indonesia produced more than the year before.
In 2013, nine of the world's 14 major producing regions recorded growth in output, they are: Australia, Brazil, Canada, Chile, China, Indonesia, Mexico, Papua New Guinea and Russia; In 2012 only Canada, China, Ghana, Mexico, Peru and Russia produced more than the year before. In 2013, the world's five leading gold producers, in order of total production were China (420 tons +17), Australia (250 tons +5), US (227 tons -8), Russia (218 tons +2), South Africa (145 tons -15). In 2011, all of the world's 14 major producing countries recorded growth in output except for Peru, Indonesia and Brazil (global primary production up 5.5%); list was led by China (355 tons), Australia (270 tons), USA (237 tons), Russia (200 tons), South Africa (190 tons). South Africa's drop in output (down 10% from 2010 to 2012) is not a result of resource depletion but rather high production costs.

The Big 10 

these previous top companies succumbed to M&A

Sources and other information
since July 1, 2019, the acquired Newmont mines contributed revenue of $1,184 million and net income of $322 million for the year ended December 31, 2019. If the acquisition had occurred on January 1, 2019, consolidated revenue and consolidated net income for 2019 would have been $10,745 million and
$4,500 million, respectively.
2008 ranking Gold Strategist
total resource 
 1 tonne = 1000 kg = 2204.6 lbs = 35,273.9619 ounces; 1 ton = 2000 lbs = 32,000 ounces
 Newcrest Mining started including Lihir Gold assets in mid-2010 (revenue and profit changes are based on pre merger assets in 2009 and merged assets in 2010).
 Metrics such as cash costs, revenue for years prior to 2011 were changed due to the transition in accounting standards from Generally Accepted Accounting Principles (GAAP) to International Financial Reporting Standards.
For 2012 Barrick Gold's overall losses can be attributed to a $4 billion writedown on copper assets incurred during the final quarter.
Gold Fields production down due to unbundling of certain assets in South Africa into a newly created company called Sibanye Gold.
 3 of the companies took on major writedowns on their assets in the last quarter of 2011 and that affected their annual profits (Newmont $1.6B, Kinross $2.94B, Agnico-Eagle Mines $644.9M).
Newmont operates Australia's two biggest gold mines, Boddington and Kalgoorlie.
On July 25, 2011, Polyus Gold and KazakhGold merged.
In 2013 Goldcorp, Newmont, Newcrest, Kinross, AngloGold, and Eldorado produced more gold than the previous year.  In 2012 it was Yamana, Kinross, and Polyus Gold that produced more.  In 2011 it was Newmont, Newcrest, Kinross and Eldorado.
November 8, 2012 – Goldcorp (+3.5%) overtakes Barrick Gold (-25%) in market value.

Canadian companies 
Even though Canada lags far behind its counterparts in its amount of central bank gold reserves, Canadian companies dominate the industry.  These companies are big players in the Canadian industry which ranks 7th globally but rely mostly on assets in foreign countries (Barrick Gold alone produced 209.79 tonnes of gold in 2009, Canada produced 100 tonnes).  In fact 75% of the world's mining companies are headquartered in Canada.  Canada's biggest undeveloped gold deposit is the Kerr Sulphurets Mitchell copper-gold property in northwestern British Columbia; It holds 38.2 million ounces of gold (2P reserves steady in 2012, up 27% in 2011).  Another project in the Detour Lake area of Ontario ranks 4th among North America's deposits (up from six in July 2010).  Among the largest gold containing properties controlled by Canadian companies is Goldcorp's wholly owned billion ounce silver, 18 million ounce gold Penasquito mine in Mexico and Ivanhoe Mines' 81.3 billion pound copper, 46.4 million ounce gold Oyu Tolgoi deposit in Mongolia.  Barrick Gold owns 50% of Super Pit, Australia's biggest gold mine.

60% of the country's gold output come from six mines, they are Red Lake 493,000 oz, Malartic 475,277 oz, Meadowbank 430,613 oz, Porcupine 291,900 oz, Musselwhite 256,300 oz, Detour Lake 232,287 oz.

In 2018 the Canadian embassy in Athens, Greece was attacked with sledgehammers and red paint by an anarchist group opposed to the embassy's support for Eldorado Gold Corp.’s mining plans in Greece.

As of September 2009, there were 20 companies in the country with a market cap of 1 billion dollars or more.
Barrick Gold Corp. is the country's largest gold mining company by several measures of size.  After growing 3.35% on the year, on November 8, 2012 Goldcorp leapfrogs Barrick Gold in capitalization – Barrick lost 25% of its market value that year.
In the following table are Canada's 10 highest valued gold mining companies for 2010 as well as 6 other mid cap companies.

Notes – Kinross Gold was 13.50 billion in May before it acquired Red Back Mining.  Osisko Mining was $10 million in 2005 and $3.5 billion May 2010.

South Africa 
The world's 5th largest gold producer (170 tons in 2012) that is home to two of the world's ten largest gold mines.  As recently as 2007 South Africa was the world's top gold producer.  The drop in its global ranking is not due to resource depletion (South Africa ranks close behind leader Australia in reserves) but rather to its high costs of production.  In fact South Africa has the highest mining cash costs among all major producing regions.

Notable South African gold companies include:
 AngloGold Ashanti – world's 3rd biggest gold producer (but has very high cash costs per ounce) at 3.944 million ounces in 2012.  AngloGold is also South Africa's largest producer of uranium (1.46 million pounds in 2010), a position that was strengthened in July 2011 when it acquired 20% of Canada's First Uranium.
 Gold Fields – produced 2.2 million ounces of gold in 2013, down from 3.254 million ounces on the year ended June 30, 2012; 2011 production  roughly the same as 2010.  Its largest new mine has the potential to produce at a rate of 1 million ounces annually (though it produced 175,000 in 2009).  It is South Africa's second leading producer.  During 2013 the company spun off some of its assets into a new company called Sibanye Gold.
 Harmony Gold (mining) – was the 5th largest producer of gold in 2008 (has since fallen off a bit, production was 2.33 million ounces (66.05 tonnes) in 2008 compared to 1.56 million (44.23 tonnes) in fiscal 2010)

Forbes Global 2000 
The Forbes Global 2000 list is produced annually by Forbes. Compiling information about each of the 2000 largest companies globally it ranks them.  These are all of the gold companies that made the list in 2015.  Companies that dropped out of the list, 2016: Osisko Gold Royalties; 2015: Polyus Gold, Newcrest Mining; 2014: Anglogold Ashanti, Yamana, Gold Fields, Kinross, Buenaventura, Shandong Mining, Eldorado; 2013: Iamgold; 2012: Agnico Eagle Mines.

It ranks them based on a number of factors, the top companies on its list aren't necessarily the biggest.  Data reflects the 12-month period ending March 2016 for companies based in the United States, Canada and Bermuda.  For all other countries, data is for the last fiscal year period.

Source: May 6, 2015: The Global 2000

References